Blackstar is a science-fiction novel written by author Josh Viola (The Bane of Yoto) based on the Wish Upon a Blackstar album by American electronic rock artist, Celldweller.

Background
While Klayton was working on Wish Upon a Blackstar, he envisioned a story based on the album.

Also, Klayton decided to write a musical score to the novel.

[...] I will be releasing a soundtrack to accompany each act of the book. I'm creating the music that I hear when I watch this movie in my head.[...] My "hope" (but not "promise") is to have a full album of score to release when the full book is released.

The book will be first released as an eBook with the score. A paperback release is planned for a later release when all acts have been completed.  (Paperback Cover Art)

Acts

Act One: Purified
The first act was released on December 3, 2013.

Act Two: Awakening
The second act was released on June 3, 2014.

Act Three
The third act was released with the full book on September 18, 2015.

Synopsis
In a world blasted and barren, the last bastion of civilization is the fortress-city of Central. The people within its walls gladly accept the dominion of Kaine, the city's benevolent arbiter, in return for his gift to them - Re:memory. This public archive contains humanity's memories of the world before it was destroyed, allowing them to relive the lost glories of the past.

Rezin doesn't know who he is or how he came to be in Central, but he does know this: he is a Reaper. His combination of gifts and abilities allow him to decrypt any system and steal information to sell to the highest bidder. His talents afford him a life of luxury until the day he plugs into Re:memory and reaps something he wasn't looking for, something he doesn't understand - and something that Kaine will do anything to retrieve.

Forced to flee into the dangerous Outlands, Rezin must dodge Kaine's pursuing forces even as he finds that the secret he took from Re:memory is transforming him, awakening within him powers he can't control. When he encounters mysterious twins with powers of their own, Rezin begins a journey beyond the confines of the world he knew, a journey that will lead him across space and time, a journey that will bring him face to face with the nature of the universe - and of himself.

Score

Track listing
The first part of the score accompanying Act One: Purified includes seven songs and its length is 45:25 minutes.  On March 1, 2013, a short preview of "Purified" was included in a video on Celldweller's YouTube Channel. An extended preview of "Retros" was released on May 3, 2013. Act One: Purified was also released as Limited Edition CDs of 150 hand-numbered copies that included a bonus track. The second act, Blackstar Act Two: Awakening, had 250 hand-numbered Limited Edition CDs on sale. In addition to the released songs, one more song was mentioned by Klayton.

References

2013 American novels
2013 science fiction novels
American science fiction novels